Eskisehir Osmangazi University, abbreviated as ESOGU, is located in Eskişehir, in the Eskişehir Province of Turkey.

History 
Eskişehir Osmangazi University (ESOGU) is a state university that dates back to the foundation of the Faculty of Medicine, the Faculty of Engineering and Architecture and the Faculty of Letters and Applied Sciences in 1970. These pioneering faculties became the founders of Anadolu University in 1972. These three faculties together with Eskişehir School of Health, Eskişehir Vocational School of Health Services, Institutes of Health Sciences, Metallurgy, and Applied Sciences, newly founded Faculty of Economic and Administrative Sciences and Institute of Social Sciences, have formed Eskişehir Osmangazi University on 18 August 1993.

Affiliations
The university is a member of the Caucasus University Association.

References

Eskişehir Osmangazi University
Buildings and structures in Eskişehir
Educational institutions established in 1970
1970 establishments in Turkey